KGUD (90.7 MHz) is a non-commercial, non-profit FM radio station licensed to Longmont, Colorado.  The station is owned and operated by Longmont Community Radio.  It airs an easy listening/adult standards radio format, supported by listener donations.

History
The station began operating in September 1975 as KCDC. Licensed to the St. Vrain Valley School District, it was used by the Career Development Center, a vocational high school in Longmont, for training students in communications. When the training program ended, the District no longer had a use for the station and agreed to transfer the license to Longmont Community Radio in March 2003. The station's call sign was changed to KGUD on March 15, 2004.

See also
List of community radio stations in the United States

References

External links

GUD
Adult standards radio stations in the United States
Easy listening radio stations
Longmont, Colorado
Community radio stations in the United States